There have been at least three French or Marine Nationale ships bearing the name Vendémiaire, in honour of the month in the French Republican calendar:

 , a frégate de surveillance, currently in service.

French Navy ship names